Ban Yanuka (Bulgarian: Бан Янука), defender of Sofia from Ottoman Turks in the late 14th century was the manager/deputy of the Tsar Ivan Shishman in Sredets. It is quite possible in the person of the "ban Yanko".

References

14th-century Bulgarian people
Bans (title)
People from Sofia